Christopher Mace (24 December 1830 – 23 November 1907) was an Australian cricketer. He played one first-class cricket match for Victoria in 1861/62 and one for Otago in 1863/64.

See also
 List of Victoria first-class cricketers
 List of Otago representative cricketers

References

1830 births
1907 deaths
Australian cricketers
Otago cricketers
Victoria cricketers
People from Bedale